Al al-Bayt University (often abbreviated AABU) is a public university in Jordan. It is located on the outskirts of the city of Mafraq, 65 Kilometers to the north-east of the capital Amman. The university has integrated academic facilities, student housing, and social services on one site, extending over an area of 7.539 square kilometers.

The university ranks among the top ten universities in the Kingdom.

History 
On August 17, 1992, a Royal Decree was issued ordaining the establishment of Al al-Bayt University. Royal Message stated that the university was to meet an urgent need for a new kind of university, combining the requirements of scientific methodology in teaching and research with the requirements of Muslim belief and clarity of vision on the other.

The university states that it is intended to uphold the principles of freedom, justice, tolerance, respect of other people's beliefs and faiths, and co-existence. On December 16, 1992, another Royal Decree was issued approving the formation of Al al-Bayt Special Royal Committee, under the chairmanship of Crown Prince Hassan, and the membership of selected high-standing scholars and intellectuals from Jordan and other parts of the Islamic world. The main task of this committee was to lay the foundation of the university, and to submit its decisions on operational and administrative issues to the King for his final approval or decision.

The Royal Decree pertaining to the appointment of the first President of Al al-Bayt University was issued on May 22, 1993. Immediately thereafter, a number of administrative, academic and technical committees were set up to carry out the mission of establishing the university, each in accordance to its assigned responsibilities.

After completing its infrastructure, recruiting distinguished faculty members, and defining its courses and programs, the university was ready to receive its first group of students on October 1, 1994. Under the patronage of King Hussein, and in the presence of Crown Prince Hassan, Al al-Bayt University was officially inaugurated on March 6, 1995 (6 Ramadan 1415 H).

Academics 
The university has nine faculties; each one branches out into multiple departments. The faculties are:

Prince Hussein bin Abdullah Faculty of Information Technology
Faculty of Finance and Business Administration
Princess Salma Faculty of Nursing
Faculty of Sharia
Faculty of Law
Faculty of Arts and Humanities
Faculty of Engineering
Faculty of Science
Faculty of Educational Sciences
Faculty of Earth and Environmental Sciences

The university also services other institutions:
 Bayt Al-Hekmah
 The Institute of Astronomy & Space Sciences
 Higher Institute of Islamic Studies
In 2014, the university diversified its Faculty of Arts and Humanities, including more majors in Italian, Spanish, French, English, in addition to Arabic. Two master's degrees in English Language have also been introduced: one in Literature and Criticism and the other in Linguistics.

According to a fact sheet issued by the university, as of 2015, Al al-Bayt runs 35 undergrad programs, 33 MA programs, and 2 PhD programs.

Journals 
The two most prominent journals published by the university are

Jordan Journal of Islamic Studies
Al-Manarah Journal

References

 
Educational institutions established in 1993
Universities in Jordan
Mafraq Governorate
1993 establishments in Jordan